Gypsochares astragalotes is a moth of the family Pterophoridae that is known from South Africa.

References

Oidaematophorini
Moths described in 1909
Endemic moths of South Africa